Alban Çejku (born 23 July 2001) is an Albanian professional footballer who plays as a left back for Albanian club Tirana.

Career statistics

Club

Honours
Tirana
 Albanian Superliga: 2019–20

References

External links

2001 births
Living people
Footballers from Tirana
Albanian footballers
People from Tirana County
People from Tirana
Association football midfielders
Kategoria Superiore players
KF Tirana players
Albania youth international footballers